Karen Gorden is a conductor and music director for symphony, opera, and contemporary classical music.

Musical life and career
Gorden’s conducting career is associated with significant musical centres in Europe, the United States, and Asia such as the Staatsoper Berlin, The John F. Kennedy Center for the Performing Arts, and the National Centre for the Performing Arts in Mumbai, India.

Known as a musician's conductor, Gorden has been consistently welcomed by a wide and diverse international audience.  She is an outspoken advocate for global accessibility and sustainability for the arts.

Gorden has been awarded significant international prizes, including the Special Jury Prize from the 50th Concours International d'Exécution Musicale de Genève for Conductors in Switzerland, the Prix Nadia Boulanger in France, and the Opera Award at the State Theatre Opava in the Czech Republic. She is a graduate with top honors of the Conservatoire National Supérieur de Musique de Lyon and the Yale University School of Music.

References

External links
WorldCat Identities: Karen Gorden, worldcat.org/identities/
Official website: http://www.karengorden.com

Women conductors (music)
Musicians from Springfield, Ohio
Yale University alumni
Living people
Classical musicians from Ohio
21st-century American conductors (music)
Year of birth missing (living people)